Willy Fauade William (born 14 April 1981) is a French DJ, record producer and singer, famous for his club remixes and vocal collaborations with a number of dance music artists. He is most famous for his French hit "Ego" and his Latin hit "Mi Gente", the latter with J Balvin.

Early life
Born to an Ethiopian mother and a French Guadeloupean father in 1981, in Fréjus, Provence-Alpes-Côte d'Azur, France, he was brought up in the small town of Champagné, Pays de la Loire, in northwestern France.

Career 
He came to prominence in 2003 with his work with DJ Flex in the dancefloor hit "B Boyz Shake da Body" and in 2004 as producer of "Tragedie" using the pseudonym "Lord William". He later joined the French music collective Collectif Métissé, also continuing to produce his own materials.

He collaborated with a great number of artists producing their songs and taking part in vocals as featured artists. He charted with collaborative songs with DJ Assad with "Li tourner", Les Jumo with "C Show" and "L'Italienne", and with Keen'V in "On s'endort?", Ridsa in "Je n'ai pas eu le temps" that also featured Ryan Stevenson on drums and many others.

In 2016, Willy got his major French hit with "Ego" which was produced and sung by himself. It was the main single from his 2016 album Une seule vie and his biggest French hit as a solo artist. "Ego" charted in France, Italy, Germany, Belgium and Poland amongst many others.

In 2017, he became an international sensation after the release of "Mi Gente" a collaboration with the superstar Colombian artist J Balvin. The huge international success of the song led to a version that also featured Beyoncé in a new remix. The song received a Latin Billboard Music Award and the music video amassed over 2 billion views and received in 2018 an MTV Video Music Award for Best Latin Video, maintained #1 Spotify Global for 12 consecutive weeks, while topping charts across the world as #1 in a great number of countries.

In 2018, Willy produced and released a dance track called "La La La" and he appeared on "Goodbye", a David Guetta and Jason Derulo song that featured William and Nicki Minaj.

Willy William is a "Latin Grammy" nominated DJ / Producer mainly for "Mi Gente". His song "Ego" made him the #1 most Shazamed French Artist.

Discography

Albums

Singles

As lead artist

Notes
 Note 1: Uses combined chart entries for "Mi Gente" and "Mi Gente (remix)"1
*Did not appear in the official Belgian Ultratop 50 charts, but rather in the bubbling under Ultratip charts.
**Did not appear in the official Belgian Ultratop 50 charts, but rather in the bubbling under Tipparade charts.

Featured in
Internationally

Francophone markets

*Did not appear in the official Belgian Ultratop 50 charts, but rather in the bubbling under Ultratip charts.
**Did not appear in the official Belgian Ultratop 50 charts, but rather in the bubbling under Tipparade charts.

Other songs

*Did not appear in the official Belgian Ultratop 50 charts, but rather in the bubbling under Ultratip charts.
**Did not appear in the official Belgian Ultratop 50 charts, but rather in the bubbling under Tipparade charts.

References

Notes

Sources

External links 

Living people
French DJs
French electronic musicians
French record producers
French people of Mauritian descent
Black French musicians
1981 births
Electronic dance music DJs
21st-century French singers
21st-century French male singers